East Cape is the easternmost point of the main islands of New Zealand.

East Cape may also refer to:

 East Cape (New Zealand electorate), 1978–1993
 East Cape (Cabo del Este), Baja California, Mexico
 East Cape, a volcano on Buldir Island, Alaska, US
 East Cape Girardeau, Illinois, US
 Cape Dezhnev, Russia, formerly known as East Cape
 Eastern Cape Province in South Africa